Yōki-sō (揚輝荘) is a Japanese villa and gardens located in Chikusa-ku, Nagoya, central Japan. It is close to Nittai-ji temple.

History 
The grounds were built for Itō Suketami (1878-1940), the president of the Matsuzakaya Company, from the 1910s to the 1930s. A number of historic structures throughout Japan that were endangered were acquired by him, disassembled, transported and reassembled on his property. During the bombing of Nagoya in World War II in March 1945, a number of structures were destroyed.

Most of those that have remained have been designated as Tangible Cultural Property by the city. Parts of the estate were sold off so the property is now divided in two halves. The grounds today are administered by a non-profit organisation.

Northern premises 
 Bangaro was designed by Teiji Suzuki for Itō Suketami as his cottage. Upstairs it has a Japanese tea ceremony room that was originally from the Tokugawa lords of the Owari Domain. The checkerboard pattern on the wall is called ichimazu and can also be found on the brick chimney outside. The building is a blend of Japanese and western architecture.
 Hakuun Bridge
 Sanshotei
 North Garden

Southern premises 
 Choshokaku reception hall, constructed in c.1935, renovated in 2013
 Yōki-sō Zashiki
 South Garden

References

External links 

 Official homepage

Chikusa-ku, Nagoya
Buildings and structures in Nagoya
Gardens in Aichi Prefecture
Museums in Nagoya
Relocated buildings and structures